There Is Only One Roy Orbison is the 7th album recorded by Roy Orbison, and his first for MGM Records, released in July 1965. It features his studio recording of "Claudette", an Orbison-penned song which had become a hit for The Everly Brothers in 1958. Ironically, at the time he recorded the song in 1965, he had divorced his wife Claudette who had inspired the lyrics. Orbison later re-recorded the song for In Dreams: The Greatest Hits in 1985. (They later reconciled in 1966, before her death in a motorcycle accident in June of that year near Galatin, Tennessee.) The single taken from it, though, was "Ride Away", which reached #25 in the US charts, #12 in Australia and #34 in the UK.  Cash Box described "Ride Away" as a "rhythmic teen-angled ode about a somewhat ego-oriented lad who cuts-out on romance."

History
In 1965, Roy Orbison was riding high with the hit single "Oh, Pretty Woman", which was No. 1 globally, when word got about that his Monument contract was due to expire in June. Orbison was interested in Hollywood and signed to MGM Records for $1 million for three albums per year from 1965-1985. Half of the money went to Decca's London Records. He also was looking for freedom when he signed with the label. His producer for Monument Records, Fred Foster and Orbison's manager Wesley Rose were having disagreements about whether or not to keep Orbison. This album charted at No. 10 in the UK and No. 55 (No. 41 on Cash Box, while reaching the Top 30 on Record World) in the US. It was recorded at the RCA Studios in Nashville.

Track listing

Produced by Wesley Rose & Jim Vienneau

References

Roy Orbison albums
1965 albums
Albums produced by Wesley Rose
MGM Records albums